The Manjusrigrha inscription is an inscription dated 714 Saka (792 CE), written in Old Malay with Old Javanese script. The inscription was discovered in 1960 on the right side of stairs entrance of Sewu pervara (guardian or complementary smaller temple) no. 202 on west side. This inscription is linked to Sewu temple. According to this inscription, the original name of Sewu temple compound is probably Manjusrigrha. Sewu temple is located approximately 800 meters north of Prambanan temple, Central Java, Indonesia. The inscription was carved on an andesite stone block measured 71 cm x 42 cm x 29 cm.

Contents

Transcription

Transcription according to Badan Pelestarian Cagar Budaya Jawa Tengahː

// Śri swasti śakawarsātīta 714 kārttika māsa caturddaśi śuklapaksa śukra

wāra wās pon   tatkālānda daŋ nāyaka di raaanada lūrawaŋ nāmanda mawrddhi diŋ

wajrāsana mañjuśrīgrha nāmāñan prāsāda tlas si(d)a maŋdrsti mañamwah

si(d)a di daŋ hyaŋ daśadiśa w(d)ita yaŋ pranidhānanda naras samanta (p)untārā(-) // pha

lāŋku marmangap punya di janmeni paratra lai kalpawrksa muah āku (d)iŋ

jagat sacarācarā sarwwasatwopajīwyaku sarwwasatweka nāya

(k)a sarwwasatwa paritrāt sarwwasatweka wāndha(w)a // pranidhini mahā

tyanta śraddhāwega samudgata mañjuśrīgrha samumbh®ta sarwwa śrī sula

wājana // prāsādeni kumangap ya punyānda śrī nareśwara iha janma para

trāŋku jānan sārak danan si(d)a // ini janma kuminta ya nissāraka

dali(b)iga ājñā naarendra sāna prstŋ (...) (...) di (ŋ) jagat traya // ājñā

nda kujunjuŋ nitya diŋ jameni paratra lai baraŋ kāryya mahābhāra

āku mūah susārathi // swā(m)ikaryya(ka) daksāku sāmiwitta

ku parñama(n) swāmibhakti dr(d)abhedya phalabhukti ānindita //

phala punya kubhukti ya dari ājña nareśwara diŋ janmaga

ticakreni swāmi mūah parāyana

Translation 
The inscription is written in 16 lines. Translated by Kusen:

"In the year 714 Saka, Karttika month, day 14 Paroterang, Friday, Wās, Pon, Dang Nayaka Dirandalurawa has completed (the renovation of) a prasada named Vajrasana Manjusrigrha. Satisfied the heart of those whom working together. After the Dang Hyang Dasadisa being completed in this noble effort. Many people from all directions came to marvel this homage (building) from those whom already died and gave their sacrifice. From all directions people attended. All the creature, the kanayakan dwellers, all the protected beings, all the villagers that contribute in this auspicious effort seem very happy (satisfied) with the completion of Manjusrigrha, buildings with beautiful pinaccle. This Prasada was presented by Srinaresvara that already manifest into the realm of gods (died). All the poor people, foolish restless slaves, were unable to understand the meaning of Narendra's order as the sarana (means or vehicle?) of the world. I will always uphold his order until death, as well as his works seen by me as a good (carriage) driver. The wisdoms (wits), works, thoughts of my lord are soothing, my lord persistent attention just like unstained food. The fruit (results) of this noble deed were acquired from the guidance of Naresvara upon human beings, and my lord's protection is ultimate".

The inscription mentioned about the renovation of a sacred buddhist building (Prasada) Vajrasana to house the Manjusri. This clearly demonstrates Tantrayana—Vajrayana buddhism influence. The temple dedicated to Manjusri is identified as Sewu temple, located not far north from Prambanan temple.

See also
Canggal inscription (732)
Kalasan inscription (778)
Kelurak inscription (782)
Karangtengah inscription (824)
Tri Tepusan inscription (842)

References

Inscriptions in Indonesia
8th-century inscriptions
Shailendra dynasty
792
Mañjuśrī